Grove High School is a public high school in the city of Grove, Oklahoma, United States. It is one of four schools in a school district that includes Grove Lower Elementary School, Grove Upper Elementary School and Grove Middle School.

The school mascot is the "Ridgerunner".

Curriculum
The U.S. state of Oklahoma requires students to take four units of English, three units of mathematics and three units of science in order to graduate. Students must also complete a unit of American History, a half unit of Oklahoma History, a half unit of United States Government and an additional unit in social studies courses.

Oklahoma high schools must provide an elective physical education course, unless provided an exemption by the Oklahoma State Department of Education due to undue hardship.

Students are also required to take two units of a non-English language, two units of computer technology and a unit of fine arts or speech.

Grove High School also offers Advanced Placement courses and concurrent enrollment courses through the Northeast Oklahoma Career Tech Center.

Extracurricular activities

Grove High School offers many extracurricular activities for students including an academic competition team, athletics, a robotics education program, marching band, competitive speech, art, choir, FCCLA, FFA, and a drama program. There are also several community service clubs including Character Counts, Interact. Other groups are the Heritage Club for Native American students, Teen Court, Student Council, Spanish Club, Math Club, and Yearbook.

Notable alumni
 Jim Beauchamp, Former Major League Baseball player

References

External links
 

Public high schools in Oklahoma
Schools in Delaware County, Oklahoma